The Ohr ha-Chaim Synagogue is situated on Ohr ha-Chaim Street in the Armenian Quarter of the Old City of Jerusalem. It is located on the top floor of a building which also houses the Ari Synagogue and Old Yishuv Court Museum. It is named after Rabbi Chaim ibn Attar's magnum opus, the Ohr ha-Chaim, a popular commentary on the Pentateuch. 

Arriving in Jerusalem from Morocco in 1742, Rabbi Attar established a study hall in this building together with a women's section. In  a room at the back of the men's section is where, according to tradition, Rabbi Attar would study with Eliyahu Ha-Navi. A number of years ago a mikveh was uncovered near the stairs which lead to the women's section, confirming a long-standing tradition of its existence.

Though the synagogue was founded by a kabbalist of Sephardic descent, the synagogue eventually came to serve the Ashkenazic community, headed by Rabbi Shlomo Rosenthal. When the Jewish Quarter fell to the Arab Legion in 1948, during the Arab-Israeli War, the synagogue was closed. It was reopened and refurbished after Israel captured the Old City in 1967.

See also

 Oldest synagogues in the world

External links
Jewish Quarter Jerusalem: Ohr HaChaim Synagogue

Synagogues in Jerusalem